Hamraaz is a 1967 Indian Bollywood suspense thriller film, produced and directed by B. R. Chopra and written by Akhtar-Ul-Iman. It stars Raaj Kumar, Sunil Dutt, Vimi, Mumtaz in lead roles, with Balraj Sahni, Madan Puri, Jeevan, Iftekhar, Sarika in other important roles. The film's music is by Ravi, while the lyrics were penned by Sahir Ludhianvi. The film won the National Film Award for Best Feature Film in Hindi.

Plot
Kumar is a well-known stage actor in Bombay, who performs plays along with his partner Shabhnam. While on a trip to scenic Darjeeling, he meets and falls in love with Meena, the only daughter of a wealthy military contractor, Verma. Shortly thereafter, Kumar and Meena get married and return home to Bombay. Four years later, Meena's dad passes away after telling her that she had given birth to a baby girl which he had hidden from her for her future life ahead and takes a promise to not reveal this to Kumar. He gives her some papers before passing away as a proof of that girl child. After her Father's death Meena goes to Orphanage and checks on that girl and brings her home to Mumbai saying she wants to adopt the girl. Kumar refuses this and Meena has to send the kid back to Orphanage. 

During a christmas party in Mumbai, Meena meets Mahender(Rajesh's friend) and Mahender starts blackmailing Meena that he has some letters which she had written to Rajesh. He keeps calling Meena to visit him in hotel. Soon, Kumar notices that Meena does not accompany him to the stage any more, and excuses herself on the pretext of being ill. He finds clues that suggest that she is meeting somebody else on the sly. Suspicious, Kumar makes the excuse of going to Pune, and instead dons a beard and goes by the name of S.N. Sinha. He checks into a hotel, and writes his name in the hotel register. That night, he returns to his home, to find the door open, and before he can investigate anything, he hears a gunshot. Kumar runs into the room and finds Meena dead, shot in her chest.

Enraged, he decides to call the police station, but realizes that he will be implicated in the murder – his fingerprints are on the gun, he is in disguise, and he is next to the body. Kumar returns to the hotel instead, and smokes a lot of cigarettes. The case is assigned to Inspector Ashok, and the next day, when Kumar "returns" to Bombay, Ashok observes that Kumar knows which room the body is in, without being told by anyone.

The coconut seller near Kumar's house says that he saw a bearded man in the area the night of the murder, and the owner of the hotel which Kumar had checked into calls the police, saying that a bearded man had checked into his hotel. The cigarettes that Kumar had smoked are recovered, and handed over to Ashok. When he visits Kumar at his house the next day, Kumar offers him the same brand of cigarette, rousing his suspicion. Soon, more clues surface, pointing at Kumar as the killer.

In a fit of haste, Kumar decides to run away from the growing suspicion of Inspector Ashok. His friend, lawyer Jagmohan, says that he will now definitely be implicated as the murderer of Meena. Desperate, he finds a clue about the suspected killer from his home – a key with room number of a hotel. Kumar visits the room as a last attempt to clear things before he is caught. There, he meets Captain Rajesh who calms him down and tells him that none of them is the real killer. He tells Kumar that he is his wife's first husband, who was supposedly killed on the front, and how he wanted her to acquire their illegitimate child, Sarika, because she wouldn't be able to raise a child born out of wedlock.

Captain Rajesh tells Kumar that whoever the killer is, he was seen by Sarika because she was present in the room where Meena was murdered while both mother and daughter were playing and their activities being recorded by a video camera. Together, they try to find the girl, eventually tracing her to Ooty. Unknown to them, Inspector Ashok is on their trail. Soon, they both are arrested by him with the help of Ooty Police. Kumar explains his case, and they try to find Sarika, and she is at the house of a man called Tejpal, who tries to run away from there. Shabnam and Jagmohan arrive with the videotape of the night that Meena was murdered. It is revealed that Tejpal is the killer, but he quickly draws a gun and picks up Sarika, threatening to kill her should any of them try to stop him.

Captain Rajesh manages to save Sarika from Tejpal, but he is shot twice by the latter. Now free to attack him, Ashok draws his gun and shoots Tejpal, and Kumar rushes over to Captain Rajesh. Tejpal is killed by Ashok and Sarika is safe. Captain Rajesh dies, and at the end of the movie, Kumar tells Shabnam that he cannot work – Meena was his only inspiration. Shabnam shows him Sarika sitting in Meena's seat, and he embraces Shabnam.

Cast
Raaj Kumar as Captain Rajesh 
Sunil Dutt as Kumar 
Vimi as Meena
Mumtaz as Shabnam
Balraj Sahni as Inspector Ashok 
Madan Puri as Tejpal 
Jeevan as Thakur
Iftekhar as Advocate Jagmohan 
Anwar Hussain as Captain Mahendra
Manmohan Krishna as Major Verma
Achala Sachdev as Matron
Urmila Bhatt as Mrs. Tejpal
Sarika as Sarika
Mubarak as Mr. Sahni
Keshav Rana as Hotel Shiraz's Receptionist
Nana Palsikar as Jamna
Nazir Kashmiri as Doctor
Helen as Dancer

Soundtrack

The music was composed by Ravi, and the lyrics were penned by Sahir Ludhianvi. Mahendra Kapoor won the Filmfare Award for Best Playback Singer for the song "Neele Gagan Ke Tale".

Awards
1968 Filmfare Best Male Playback Award for Mahendra Kapoor for the song "Neele Gagan Ke Tale"
1968 National Film Award for Best Cinematography for M. N. Malhotra
1968 Filmfare Best Cinematographer Award for M. N. Malhotra

References

External links 
 

Hamraaz 
1967 films
1960s Hindi-language films
Films whose cinematographer won the Best Cinematography National Film Award
Films directed by B. R. Chopra
Films scored by Ravi
Best Hindi Feature Film National Film Award winners